Culpa in contrahendo is a Latin expression meaning "fault in conclusion of a contract". It is an important concept in contract law for many civil law countries, which recognize a clear duty to negotiate with care, and not to lead a negotiating partner to act to his detriment before a firm contract is concluded. In German contract law, § 311 BGB lists a number of steps by which an obligation to pay damages may be created.

By contrast, in English contract law, and many other common law jurisdictions, there has been stulted judicial acceptance of this concept. The doctrine of estoppel has been mooted by academics as a good model, but judges have refused to let it be a sidestep of the doctrine of consideration, saying estoppel must be a shield not a sword, and calling instead for Parliamentary intervention. On the other hand, in the case of land, proprietary estoppel effectively created obligations regardless of any pre-existing contract. In the United States, however, courts have allowed promissory estoppel to function as a substitute for the consideration doctrine. This movement was stimulated by the acceptance of the concept in section 90 of the first Restatement of Contracts.

German law
Rudolf von Jhering is credited with developing the culpa in contrahendo doctrine. Originally, according to the prevailing interpretation of the German Civil Code, there was no such legal doctrine. The courts saw a gap in the law and used the culpa in contrahendo doctrine to fill it.

Since the 2001 reform of the law of obligations, culpa in contrahendo is provided for by statute. (§311(2) in connection with §§280(1) and 241(2) of the German Civil Code).

Belgian law 

Article 1382 of the Belgian Civil Code is the general legal basis to pursue compensation for damage as a result of a culpa in contrahendo.

See also
 Waltons Stores Ltd v Maher
 Friedrich Kessler and Edith Fine, Culpa in Contrahendo, Bargaining in Good Faith, and Freedom of Contract: A Comparative Study, 77 Harv. L. Rev. 401 (1964).

References

Rudolf von Jhering, “Culpa in contrahendo oder Schadensersatz bei nichtigen oder nicht zur Perfection gelangten Verträgen”, Jahrbüchern für die Dogmatik des heutigen römischen und deutschen Privatrechts, vol. 4, 1861, pp. 1–3; reprinted in Rudolf von Jhering, Gesammelte Aufsätze (1881). Jhering argued that the "reliance measure" ought to be the proper one in "not quite" contracts, e.g. where there is a misunderstanding as to the terms of the contract.

Contract law
Latin legal terminology